The following table lists software packages with their own article on Wikipedia that are nominal EM (electromagnetic) simulators;

References

 
Software comparisons